Alwin Schultz (6 August 1838 – 10 March 1909) was a German art historian and medievalist, professor of art history at the Charles University in Prague.

Biography
He was born at Muskau, Lusatia. He studied archaeology and Germanic philology at the University of Breslau (1858/59 and 1862–64), and in 1859–61 attended the Bauakademie in Berlin, where he also took drawing classes. In 1866 he became a docent for Christian archaeology and art history at Breslau, where in 1872 he was named an associate professor. In 1882 he was called to the University of Prague as a full professor.

Among his publications are a treatise on the Minnesingers in two volumes (1889) and a discussion of Germany in the 14th and 15th centuries (1892) as well as a treatise on domestic life in Europe during the Middle Ages and the Early Modern period (1903).

Bibliography
 1868: Das Rathhaus zu Breslau in seinen äusseren und inneren Ansichten und Details, (with Carl Lüdecke).
 1869: Beschreibung der Breslauer Bilderhandschrift des Froissart – Description of the Breslau manuscript of Froissart.
 1870: Schlesiens Kunstleben im dreizehnten und vierzehnten Jahrhundert – Silesian artistic life in the thirteenth and fourteenth centuries.
 1878:	Die Legende vom Leben der Jungfrau Maria und ihre Darstellung in der bildenden Kunst des Mittelalters – The legend of the life of the Virgin Mary: and its representation in the visual arts of the Middle Ages.
 1882: Untersuchungen zur Geschichte der Schlesischen Maler (1500-1800).
 1889:	Das höfische Leben zur Zeit der Minnesinger (2nd edition) – The court life at the time of Minnesinger.
 1892: Deutsches Leben im XIV. und XV. Jahrhundert (2 vols) – German life in the XIV and XV centuries.
 1894 et seq.: Allgemeine Geschichte der bildenden Künste – General history of the fine arts.
 1901: Kunst und Kunstgeschichte (2nd edition) – Art and art history.
 1903: Das Häusliche Leben der europäischen Kulturvölker vom Mittelalter bis zur zweiten Hälfte des XVIII. Jahrhunderts – The domestic life of the peoples of Europe from the Middle Ages to the mid-18th century.
He was the author of biographies on Karl Daniel Friedrich Bach and Johann Gustav Gottlieb Büsching in the Allgemeine Deutsche Biographie.

Notes

References
 
 Alwin Schultz de.Wikisource (bibliography)

1838 births
1909 deaths
People from Bad Muskau
People from the Province of Silesia
German art historians
German medievalists
University of Breslau alumni
Academic staff of Charles University
Academic staff of the University of Breslau